Pardis is a city in the Central District of Pardis County, Tehran province, Iran, and serves as capital of the county. It is a suburb located 17 kilometers northeast of Tehran. At the 2006 census, its population was 25,360 in 7,228 households, when it was in the Central District of Tehran County. The following census in 2011 counted 37,257 people in 11,051 households.

The latest census in 2016 showed a population of 73,363 people in 23,938 households, by which time Pardis, the city of Bumahen, and most of Siyahrud Rural District had been separated from the Central District and established Pardis County. After the census, the Central District was established, with two rural districts (Bagh-e Komesh and Karasht) and the city of Pardis as its capital.
Pardis is a planned city that at the end of its construction should reach a population of 600,000.

See also
Pardis Technology Park

References

External links

(ADSL - Wireless - Dial up - Persian)
Pardis Technology Park (in Persian)
Parsonline Data Centre at Pardis Technology Park

Pardis County

Cities in Tehran Province

Populated places in Tehran Province

Populated places in Pardis County

Planned cities in Iran